The 1914 Connaught Cup was the second edition of the Canadian National Challenge Cup, one of the oldest soccer tournaments in Canada and one of the first national championships. It was won by Norwood Wanders of St. Boniface, Manitoba. Current editions of the tournament feature a representative from each provincial association and a final match; in 1914 as well as 1913, the competition was played in a league format (under the old system, a win was worth 2 points with a draw worth 1).

1914
Canadian National Challenge Cup
National Challenge Cup